Pamela Williams (born 1963) is an American smooth jazz saxophonist. Williams exhibits diverse musical elements in her repertoire, including nu Jazz, funk, R&B, house, Latin and pop. She is also known for her visual art.

Biography
Williams grew up in Philadelphia, Pennsylvania, which was also the adopted hometown of an early influence of hers, Grover Washington, Jr.  Playing with the Martin Luther King Jazz Ensemble at King High School in Philadelphia's historic Germantown section, Williams was required to embrace both electric jazz-funk and hardcore bebop. In 1996, she first found fame as a member of Patti LaBelle's backup band, furthering her subsequent career. Williams has toured with Teena Marie and performed with Prince, Babyface and Chante Moore.  She has appeared in music videos by artists ranging from Barry White ("Come On") to rapper/actress Queen Latifah ("Hard Times").

In 1996, Williams made her recording debut, Saxtress™, which was the "Top Contemporary Jazz Album", Billboard's Top 10 pick. A cover of Quincy Jones' "The Secret Garden (Sweet Seduction Suite)" includes guest performances by female soul vocalists Pat Peterson, Patti LaBelle, and Teena Marie; Teena Marie also heard on "Latin Lullaby." The album also earned Williams a nomination for the Soul Train Lady of Soul Awards and the title of "Best Female Contemporary Jazz Artist" in 1996. Her subsequent recordings include Eight Days of Ecstasy (1998), Evolution (2002) (on which Williams performed vocals and keyboards, along with alto and soprano saxophone), The Perfect Love (2003), Sweet Saxations (2005), and Elixir (2006). In 2007 she recorded The Look of Love, featuring songs originally recorded by Dionne Warwick, and written by Burt Bacharach and Hal David. In November 2009, Williams released a Nu Jazz CD, Chameleon, the first release from her own indie label Saxtress™ Entertainment.

Discography

References

External links
Pamela Williams saxtress Saxophone

American jazz alto saxophonists
American women jazz musicians
Heads Up International artists
Jazz musicians from Pennsylvania
Living people
Musicians from Philadelphia
Smooth jazz saxophonists
Women jazz saxophonists
1962 births
21st-century American women musicians
21st-century American saxophonists
Martin Luther King High School (Philadelphia) alumni